Agyneta issaqueena is a species of sheet weaver found in the United States. It was described by Dupérré in 2013.

References

issaqueena
Spiders described in 2013
Spiders of the United States
Endemic fauna of the United States